The Yaroslavsky suburban railway line is one of eleven railway lines used for suburban railway connections between Moscow, Russia, and surrounding areas, mostly in Moscow Oblast. The Yaroslavsky suburban railway line connects Moscow with the stations in the northeast, in particular, with the towns of Mytishchi, Korolyov, Ivanteyevka, Fryazino, Shchyolkovo, Pushkino, Krasnoarmeysk, Sergiyev Posad, Strunino, and Alexandrov. The stations the line serves are located in Moscow, as well as in the towns of Mytishchi, Kaliningrad, Shchyolkovo, Ivanteyevka, Fryazino, Noginsk, Pushkino, Krasnoarmeysk, and Sergiyev-Posad in Moscow Oblast, as well as Alexandrovsky District of Vladimir Oblast. The suburban trains have their southwestern terminus at Moscow Yaroslavsky railway station in Moscow. In the northeastern direction, the suburban trains terminate at Bolshevo, Fryazino Passazhirskaya, Monino, Shchyolkovo, Fryazevo, Pushkino, Sofrino, Krasnoarmeysk, Sergiyev Posad, Alexandrov, and Balakirevo. The line is served by the Moscow Railway subsidiary of Russian Railways and the Central Suburban Passenger Company.

The suburban railway line follows the railway which connects Moscow with Yaroslavl and continues to Arkhangelsk in the north and Vladivostok in the south. It is electrified (dc current) between Moscow and Balakirevo (and further to Danilov). Between Moscow and Balakirevo, there are at least two tracks. In Fryazevo, the railway connects to the Gorkovsky suburban railway line. The section between 81 km and Alexandrov coincides with the Greater Ring of the Moscow Railway.

History
The construction of the railway between Moscow and Sergiyev Posad was completed in 1862. The passenger traffic was opened on August 18, 1862, and the freight traffic on the Moscow - Sergiev Posad section was opened on October 3, 1862. In 1869, it was extended to Yaroslavl. The railway line between Mytishchi and Fryazevo was open in several installments: In 1895, to Shchyolkovo, in 1929 to Monino, in 1930 to Ivanteyevka, in 1935 to Fryazino, and in 1970 to Fryazevo.

In the 1920s, Yaroslavsky suburban railway line became the first suburban railway line in the Soviet Union to be electrified. In 1929, the electrification was completed between Moscow and Mytishchi. In 1930, the electrification was extended to Pushkino and Shchyolkovo, in 1931 to Sofrino, and in 1932 to Zagorsk (currently Sergiyev Posad). In the 1930s, some suburban trains run to Mytishchi and then were separated, with one part running to Pushkino, and another one to Shchyolkovo. The far distance passenger trains were still moved by steam locomotives. In 1937, the electrification was extended to Alexandrov. However, the section between Moscow and Zagorsk used dc current with 1500 Volts, and the one between Zagorsk and Alexandrov used dc current with 3000 Volts, therefore it was not suitable for suburban trains. In 1949, first suburban trains able to work with both voltages appeared, subsequently the railway platforms between Zagorsk and Alexandrov were raised to serve these trains, and in 1949 direct suburban trains from Moscow started to serve Alexandrov. During World War II, the wires were removed, and suburban trains were moved by steam locomotives, however, in 1943 the suburban railway line was re-electrified. In 1934, the section between Mytishchi and Chkalovakaya was electrified. In 1936, the electrification was extended to Monino, in 1948 to Fryazino. The section between Monino and Fryazevo was constructed electrified. In 1994, the electrification was extended to Krasnoarmeysk, and direct trains from Moscow started running.

In 1900, a railway line connecting Beskudnikovo and Losinoostrovskaya was constructed. This was done in order to facilitate the railway traffic between Moscow and Kimry (Savyolovo), since Moscow Savyolovsky railway station was not open yet. After a tram line from central line to Medvedkovo was built, in 1966 a direct connection to Losinoostrovskaya was discontinued, and the whole railway line was demolished in 1987.

In 1930, a railway line between Mytishchi and Pirogovo was built. It was closed down in 1997 and subsequently demolished.

Stations
Following the standard notations in Russia, a railway station below is called a station if it is a terminus or if it has a cargo terminal, and it is called a platform (railway stop) otherwise.

Moscow to Balakirevo
 Moscow Yaroslavsky railway station, transfer to Komsomolskaya metro station (Sokolnicheskaya line), Komsomolskaya metro station (Koltsevaya line);
 Moskva-3 (platform);
 Malenkovskaya (platform);
 Yauza (platform);
 Rostokino (platform), Rostokino station of Moscow Central Circle;
 Losinoostrovskaya (station);
 Los (platform);
 Perlovskaya (platform);
 Tayninskaya (platform);
 Mytishchi (station), connection to Fryazino Passazhirskaya and Fryazevo;
 Stroitel (platform);
 Chelyuskinskaya (platform);
 Tarasovskaya (platform);
 Klyazma (platform);
 Mamontovskaya (platform);
 Pushkino (station);
 Zavety Ilyicha (platform);
 Pravda (platform);
 Zelenogradskaya (platform);
 43 km (platform);
 Sofrino (station), connection to Krasnoarmeysk;
 Ashukinskaya (platform);
 Kalistovo (platform);
 Radonezh (platform);
 Abramtsevo (platform);
 Khotkovo (station);
 Semkhoz (platform);
 Sergiyev Posad (station);
 76 km (platform);
 81 km (platform), connection to Greater Ring of the Moscow Railway;
 83 km (platform);
 Buzhaninovo (station);
 90 km (platform);
 Arsaki (station);
 Strunino (station);
 Alexandrov I (station), connections to Ivanovo and Orekhovo-Zuyevo;
 117 km (platform, no direct connections to Moscow);
 Moshnino (platform, no direct connections to Moscow);
 Balakirevo (station), connections to Yaroslavl.

Mytishchi to Fryazevo
 Mytishchi (station);
 Podlipki-Dachnye (station);
 Bolshevo (station);
 Valentinovka (platform);
 Zagoryanskaya (platform);
 Sokolovskaya (station);
 Voronok (platform);
 Shchyolkovo (station);
 Gagarinskaya (platform);
 Chkalovskaya (platform);
 Bakhchivandzhi (platform);
 Tsiolkovskaya (platform);
 Oseyevskaya (platform);
 Monino (station);
 Kashino (platform);
 Kolontayevo (platform);
 Lesnaya (platform);
 Fryazevo (station), connection to Gorkovsky suburban railway line.

Mytishchi to Fryazino
 Mytishchi (station);
 Podlipki-Dachnye (station);
 Bolshevo (station);
 Fabrika 1 Maya (platform);
 Zelyony Bor (platform);
 Ivanteyevka-2 (platform);
 Ivanteyevka (station);
 Detskaya (platform);
 Fryazino Tovarnaya (platform);
 Fryazino Passazhirskaya (platform).

Sofrino to Krasnoarmeysk

 Sofrino (station);
 Rakhmanovo (platform);
 Fyodorovskoye (platform);
 Putilovo (platform);
 Krasnoarmeysk (station).

References

Rail transport in Moscow
Rail transport in Moscow Oblast
Rail transport in Vladimir Oblast
Moscow Railway